Sir William Lathlain (1862–1936) was the Mayor of the City of Perth in Western Australia from 1918 to 1923, and Lord Mayor from 1930 to 1932.

Poems were written about him after his first mayoral role.

He contested seats in state politics.

He was involved in the process of establishing the War Memorial in Kings Park, and said of the establishment:

The suburb of Lathlain was named after him.

References

1862 births
1936 deaths
Mayors and Lord Mayors of Perth, Western Australia